Martino "Tino" Lettieri (born 27 September 1957) is a former NASL and MISL professional soccer goalkeeper, who represented Canada twice at the Summer Olympics: 1976 and 1984 and at the 1986 FIFA World Cup.

Club career
He was born as an Italian but was raised in Canada. Lettieri began his pro career with the Montreal Castors in the National Soccer League in 1976. In 1977, he played with the Minnesota Kicks in the North American Soccer League and played there until 1981. He went on to play the Vancouver Whitecaps in 1982 and 1983 and the Minnesota Strikers in 1984. He was named NASL North American Player of the Year in 1983 and had the league's best Goals Against Average in both 1982 and 1983.

Lettieri was a regular in the original MISL. He continued to play for the Strikers as the team joined the indoor league, playing the 1984–85 season through to 1987–88. Lettieri was voted Goalkeeper of the Year for the 1986–87 season.

Lettieri finished his outdoor career in 1987 with the Hamilton Steelers in Canadian Soccer League. He was elected to the Canadian Soccer Hall of Fame in 2001.

Lettieri is often remembered for his keeping a stuffed parrot in the back of his net during games. The bird was named "Ozzie". In 1985 the league banned Ozzie from the nets.

International career
Lettieri made his full international debut for Canada on 17 September 1980 in a 3–0 victory over New Zealand in Edmonton. He earned 24 caps for Canada and was the first-choice goalkeeper from 1980 until 1986. In the 1986 World Cup, Lettieri played two of Canada's three matches, the latter of which, a 0–2 defeat to the Soviet Union in Irapuato, was his final international appearance.

Personal life
Lettieri married the daughter of Minnesota North Stars hockey player and general manager Lou Nanne. He now runs a successful food products business, Tino's Cafe Pizzeria, in Shorewood, Minnesota. His son, Vinni, played hockey for the University of Minnesota and signed with the New York Rangers in 2017.

References

External links
Tino's Pizzeria official website
 / Canada Soccer Hall of Fame
NASL/MISL stats

1957 births
Living people
1986 FIFA World Cup players
Canadian expatriate sportspeople in the United States
Canadian expatriate soccer players
Canada men's international soccer players
Canadian National Soccer League players
Canada Soccer Hall of Fame inductees
Canadian Soccer League (1987–1992) players
Canadian soccer players
CONCACAF Championship-winning players
Expatriate soccer players in the United States
Association football goalkeepers
Footballers at the 1976 Summer Olympics
Footballers at the 1984 Summer Olympics
Hamilton Steelers (1981–1992) players
Italian emigrants to Canada
Major Indoor Soccer League (1978–1992) players
Minnesota Kicks players
Minnesota Strikers (NASL) players
Montreal Castors players
North American Soccer League (1968–1984) indoor players
Naturalized citizens of Canada
North American Soccer League (1968–1984) players
Olympic soccer players of Canada
Footballers from Bari
People from Shorewood, Minnesota
Soccer players from Montreal
Vancouver Whitecaps (1974–1984) players
Minnesota Strikers (MISL) players
People of Apulian descent